Charles Darley Miller (October 23, 1868 – December 22, 1951) was a British polo player who competed in the 1908 Summer Olympics as a member of the British polo team Roehampton, which won the gold medal.

Biography
Miller was educated at Marlborough and Trinity College, Cambridge. He was an indigo planter in Bihar from 1890 to 1902. He started the Roehampton Club in 1903, managing it until 1939. He played polo for England against America in 1902, and for Rugby (where he was a trainer) from 1902 to 1914. In World War I he served in the army.

References

External links
profile
profile Olympic Sports

1868 births
1951 deaths
English polo players
English Olympic medallists
Polo players at the 1908 Summer Olympics
Olympic polo players of Great Britain
Olympic gold medallists for Great Britain
Alumni of Trinity College, Cambridge
Roehampton Trophy
International Polo Cup
Medalists at the 1908 Summer Olympics
Olympic medalists in polo